As was the custom since 1930, the 1953 Tour de France was contested by national and regional teams. Seven national teams were sent, with 10 cyclists each from Italy, Switzerland, Belgium, Spain, Luxembourg, the Netherlands and France. France additionally sent five regional teams of 10 cyclists each, divided into Ile de France, Center-North East France, South East France, West France and South West France. One Luxembourgian cyclist did not start, so 119 cyclists started the race.

The winner of the previous edition, Fausto Coppi, did not defend his title, apparently due to injury. The reasons were not clear: it could have been injury, but it was also possible that Coppi did not want to ride in the same team as his rival Gino Bartali, or that the Tour direction urged the Italian team not to select Coppi because he had dominated the 1952 Tour, or that Coppi chose to prepare for the 1953 UCI Road World Championships. The big favourites became Hugo Koblet and Louison Bobet.

The last five editions had been won by Italian and Swiss cyclists, so the French cycling fans were anxious for a French win. When team manager Michel Bidot had selected Bobet as the French team captain, controversy arose. Bobet had shown his potential strength, but had already tried to win the Tour de France five times without succeeding. His teammate Raphaël Géminiani thought that Bobet was not strong enough, after he did not finish the 1953 Giro d'Italia earlier that year.

Start list

By team

By rider

By nationality

References

1953 Tour de France
1953